The 1980 Calgary Stampeders finished in 3rd place in the Western Conference with a 9–7 record. They appeared in the Western Semi-Final where they lost to the Winnipeg Blue Bombers.

Regular season

Season Standings

Season schedule

Playoffs

West Semi-Final

Awards and records

1980 CFL All-Stars
RB – James Sykes, CFL All-Star
DE – Reggie Lewis, CFL All-Star
DB – Ray Odums, CFL All-Star

Western All-Stars
RB – James Sykes, CFL Western All-Star
OG – Mike Horton, CFL Western All-Star
DT – Ed McAleney, CFL Western All-Star
DE – Reggie Lewis, CFL Western All-Star
DB – Ray Odums, CFL Western All-Star

References

Calgary Stampeders seasons
1980 Canadian Football League season by team